Falcon Lake may refer to:

 Falcon Lake (Manitoba), Canada
 Falcon International Reservoir, at Falcon Dam on the Rio Grande river between Texas and Tamaulipas
 Falcon Lake (Colorado)
 Falcon Lake (Alaska)
 Falcon Lake (Washington)
 Falcon Lake (film), a Canadian drama film

See also
 Falcon Lake Estates, Texas
 Piracy on Falcon Lake